The Council of the Republic of the National Assembly of the Republic of Belarus is the upper house of the parliament of Belarus.

The Council consists of 64 members, and the representation is based geographically, with most of the elected members come from civil society organizations, labour collectives and public associations in their jurisdiction. Each oblast (six) and the city of Minsk (the national capital) are represented by eight members, and an additional eight members are appointed to the council via presidential quota.

It was established after the Constitution of Belarus was amended in 1996 following a referendum, replacing the Supreme Council of Belarus.

Speakers of the Council of the Republic

See also
National Assembly (Parliament) of Belarus
House of Representatives of Belarus
Politics of Belarus
List of legislatures by country

References

External links

Government of Belarus
National Assembly of Belarus
Belarus
1997 establishments in Belarus